Adrian Lee (born 9 September 1957, London, England) is an English musician, known especially for his brass instrumentation work with several well-known acts of the 1980s.

Career
Lee was first signed to Phonogram Records in the late 1970s as guitarist with the band, Red Hot. They released one single, "L-L-Lazy Days" (1976), which was produced by Mutt Lange.

Lee's first big engagement led him to play guitar and keyboards on Cliff Richard's late 1970s tours, and his 1979 album, Rock 'n' Roll Juvenile. In 1980, Lee became a member of the British goth rock band, Toyah, co-writing songs including the hit single, "Thunder in the Mountains", and he stayed with them until 1982. The same year he released his only solo album, called The Magician. He continued to write for Toyah Willcox, and appeared on her 1985 album, Minx, for which he and Wilcox wrote "Soldier of Fortune, Terrorist of Love". Minx was produced by Christopher Neil. Neil asked Lee to play on the first Mike + The Mechanics album. Lee was a member of Mike + The Mechanics until 1995.
 
Lee continued to write, produce and perform with other artists throughout his period with The Mechanics. In 1985, Lee was involved with the production, writing, and keyboards for Space Monkey, and he recorded on albums with artists such as Silent Running on the album Deep (1989), Stephen Bishop, Joan Armatrading, Chris de Burgh and 10cc. Lee is credited as co-producer on 10cc's 1995 album, Mirror Mirror.

Lee composed the music for CITV's 1994 series The Ink Thief, a comedy, science fiction, thriller starring Richard O'Brien and Toyah Wilcox.

More recently, Lee has also worked on film scores, such as The Reckoning, The Medallion and Training Day.

References

External links
Yahoo! – Adrian Lee Discography

1957 births
Living people
English pop guitarists
English male guitarists
English rock guitarists
Place of birth missing (living people)
English record producers
English songwriters
English composers
Musicians from London
Mike + The Mechanics members
Toyah (band) members
English rock keyboardists
English expatriates in the United States